Selena Etc. was a South Texas-based boutique and beauty salon, which was founded and owned by the late American singer, Selena. Selena Etc. finished its building on January 27, 1994, in Corpus Christi, Texas, which was the headquarters building. Selena opened another boutique in San Antonio, Texas, around the same time the headquarters building was complete; both were equipped with in-house beauty salons. She began manufacturing clothing along with designer Martin Gomez with designs and styles of Latin American texture and exotic clothing styles which became her trademark on stage. Hispanic Business magazine reported that the singer earned over $5 million from these boutiques. Among the employees there was the president of her fan club, Yolanda Saldívar, who had been promoted to manager of her two boutiques, as well as controlling Selena's business checking accounts. However, she would lose this position after several employees began to approach Selena's father, Abraham Quintanilla, and they informed him that they had overdue payments on their payrolls, so upon initiating an investigation in this regard, Quintanilla was convinced that Saldívar was embezzling money. On March 9, 1995, Abraham, Selena, and her sister Suzette confronted Saldívar and accused her of stealing money from the boutiques and the fan club, firing her immediately, although Selena continued to contact her due to the fact that she had several financial documents in her possession that she needed to have back. Another boutique was planned to open in Monterrey, Mexico, in 1995, but on March 31 of that year, Saldívar would murder Selena by shooting her in the back after asking her to meet at the Days Inn motel in order to return her the financial records and documents she still had. After her death, Chris Pérez, Selena's widower, took over the business. The San Antonio boutique was closed sometime after 1999. 

After the 16th anniversary of the opening of the Corpus Christi boutique, the store was officially closed as of July 1, 2009. A week after the store closed, Pérez placed a "for sale sign" in front of the building. The appraised price of the land and structure was USD$91,454 according to the Nueces County Appraisal District. Perez' asking price for the property was $165,000. The Selena Etc. store had a full-service salon, as well as Selena memorabilia. They also sold jewelry, hats and other accessories. Soon after the foreclosure, due to the low economy, all merchandise and accessories began selling at the "Selena Museum", located several miles from where the Selena Etc. building once was.

References

Selena
Defunct retail companies of the United States
Online clothing retailers of the United States
Companies based in Corpus Christi, Texas
American companies established in 1993
Retail companies established in 1993
Retail companies disestablished in 2003
1993 establishments in Texas
2009 disestablishments in Texas
Defunct companies based in Texas
Defunct online companies of the United States